Saibou  may refer to:

 Ali Saibou (1940-2011), third President of Niger.
 Joshiko Saibou (born 1990), German basketball player.